Jacques-Luc Barbier-Walbonne (1769 –1860), was a French historical and portrait painter.

Life
Barbier-Walbonne was born at Nîmes in 1769. He was a pupil of David, and painted several subjects from Roman history, and others of a less heroic kind; also portraits of the distinguished generals of France. In the Gallery of Versailles are portraits, by him, of Moreau and Moncey.

He was a soldier during the French Revolutionary period, and was shown wearing the uniform of a lieutenant in a regiment of hussars in a  drawing by Jean-Baptiste Isabey. He worked as an assistant to François Gérard, and is said to have posed for the figure of Cupid in Gérard's Cupid and Psyche, shown at the Salon in 1798.

He died at Passy in 1860.

References

Sources

External links

18th-century French painters
French male painters
19th-century French painters
1769 births
1860 deaths
People from Nîmes
Pupils of Jacques-Louis David
18th-century French male artists